Jenny Crain (born February 12, 1968 in Milwaukee, Wisconsin) is an American retired runner. She competed in the USA Outdoor Track and Field Championship in distances from 3000 meters to the marathon and in the U.S. Olympic Trials at 5,000m, 10,000m and marathon distances.

On August 21, 2007, while on a training run for her fourth Olympic Marathon Trials, an automobile driver hit Crain. She suffered a myriad of injuries including extensive brain damage, ending her competitive running career and starting a lifetime of rehabilitation.

Running career

Jenny Crain followed her brother, Peter, into competitive running in at Franklin High School in Franklin, Wisconsin. She continued her running at Ohio University where she earned All-MAC honors.

After college, Crain put running on hold while pursuing a different professional career until deciding to train for and compete in the 1996 Olympic Trials.

Traffic collision and rehab 

On August 21, 2007, while on a training run for her fourth Olympic Marathon trials, a driver hit Crain while she was crossing the intersection at Brady and Farwell streets in her hometown of Milwaukee.

The collision fractured Crain's vertebrae, shattered her jaw, bruised her aorta, and caused massive brain damage.  The traumatic brain injury resulted in a loss of spatial awareness, reading ability limitations, short-term memory impairment, difficulty walking, and balance problems.  Crain’s treatment included acute hospital care at Froedert Hospital, specialized critical care for brain injury at Milwaukee’s Sacred Heart Rehabilitation Institute, and continual therapy for over 1.5 years at Mt. Carmel. As of 2009, Crain required assisted living in her condo, and was involved in daily therapy sessions.
   
A number of initiatives were launched in response to Crain's accident:
 Jenny Crain Make It Happen Benefit fund to help pay for ongoing medical expenses.
 The Milwaukee community has hosted a variety of benefits including auctions, Make It Happen wrist bands, races, the Make it Happen Mile, and set the Guinness World Record for "most people linked together to complete a marathon" with 62 roped-together runners, competing as Team Jennipede at Milwaukee’s 2011 Lakefront Marathon.
 "The Runner’s Cookbook, Winning Recipes from Some of the World’s Best Athletes."  Half of the proceeds from the sale of this cookbook went to the Jenny Crain Make It Happen Fund.
 USA Track & Field started a Jenny Crain Mentoring Program which helps maximize opportunities and resources for developing athletes.

Results

References 

Living people
1968 births
Track and field athletes from Milwaukee
American female long-distance runners
American female marathon runners
Athletes (track and field) at the 1999 Pan American Games
Athletes (track and field) at the 2003 Pan American Games
Pan American Games track and field athletes for the United States
21st-century American women